The 2022 TCR Eastern Europe Trophy (also called 2022 TCR Eastern Europe Trophy powered by ESET for sponsorship reasons) is the fourth season of the TCR Eastern Europe Trophy.

Calendar
The TCR Eastern Europe calendar was launched on November 26, 2021 and includes six events in six countries.

Teams and drivers
Kumho Tires is the single tire supplier for the TCR Eastern Europe 2022 season.

Results

Drivers' standings
Scoring system

† – Drivers did not finish the race, but were classified as they completed over 70% of the race distance.

References

External links

TCR Eastern Europe Trophy
Eastern Europe Trophy